Gabriele Fähnrich (born 8 April 1968) is a German former gymnast who represented East Germany (GDR). She is the 1985 World champion on the uneven bars. She also finished fourth in the all-around event at the 1985 World Championships, and won a bronze medal in the team event at the 1988 Olympic Games.

Born in Hoyerswerda, Saxony, Fähnrich's parents and sister Carola were also gymnasts. Fähnrich was nine when she went to the national training center in East-Berlin and stayed there for 11 years. She competed for the club Sportvereinigung Dynamo (Sports Club Dynamo).

Problems with her coaches
In 2005 and 2006, Gabriele Fähnrich gave several interviews to German newspapers in which she told about her unhappy times in gymnastics and her many problems with the East German coaches.

The problems started in 1983, when Fähnrich was competing in Japan at the Chunichi Cup meet. During the competition, she wanted to make some photos, but had problems with her camera. A West-German gymnast, Brigitta Lehmann, who was also competing at this meet, saw that she had problems and went to her and offered her help, which Fähnrich accepted. This incident only happened a few minutes, but caused big problems for Fähnrich, because it was strictly forbidden for East Germans athletes to talk to West-Germans. After this meet, she was questioned about this incident by her coaches and later the Stasi, their reaction towards her was rude and they called her a liar.

In 1984, Fähnrich was selected for the 1984 Olympic team, but because of the boycott, she and her teammates stayed home.

In 1985 at the World Championships in Canada, she was very successful, she won a bronze medal with her team, was fourth in the All-around and became world-champion on uneven-bars.

Gabriele Fähnrich specialised on bars, her beam-routine was good but not great (she won the national beam-title in 1985, her only national title), but on floor and vault, she was weak, and that was something the GDR-coaches wanted to change after her success in Canada.

They made her train extra hard to learn new skills on floor and they wanted her to do a more difficult vault, however this new training method resulted in a knee-injury that was so bad that she couldn't compete in 1986 and it was necessary to have surgery on both knees.

Although not yet recovered from the surgery, the coaches wanted her to compete at the 1987 Worlds in Rotterdam. Because she was still not recovered, this meet was a disaster for Fähnrich, who was the worst gymnast of her team, although she scored a perfect 10.00 on bars during the team finals. Her coaches reacted furiously and refused to talk to her during their stay in Rotterdam.

Doping and the 1988 Olympics

In 1988, almost every female elite gymnast in East Germany was injured, most of them badly. Fähnrich, together with club-mates Dagmar Kersten and Ulrike Klotz became part of the doping-program of the GDR-Sport system. To make their bodies stronger, they were given doping, which had a disastrous effect on Fähnrich's body: she started to gain a lot of weight and had to stop with the programme. The coaches gave up on her and three weeks before the Olympics, they wanted to send her home.

At the national training centre she was given a last chance: She had to lose several pounds in three days, which she did by only eating one apple a day and using a lot of laxatives, which gave her gruesome stomach-pains.

At the Olympics in Seoul, she won a bronze medal in the team competition. She placed 25th overall, but did not advance to the All Around final (Top 36) because only three  gymnasts per nation were able to compete and she was the fourth ranked East German behind Dagmar Kersten (8th), Dörte Thümmler (11th) and Ulrike Klotz (16th). Her other Individual results at the Seoul Olympics were 15th (uneven bars), 22nd (balance beam), 38th (vault) and 45th (floor).

After the Olympics
After the Olympics, Fähnrich not only retired from gymnastics, but she also didn't want to have anything to do with gymnastics any more. She married and became a beautician.
In 1990 she had a daughter. Her daughter did gymnastics for a while and when the coaches told Fähnrich that her daughter was a talent, she took her daughter away from gymnastics and she took her to a karate-club instead.

She currently sits on the board of the Citizens Center Hohenschönhausen.

References

External links
1983 Asymmetric Bars
1983 Vault
http://www.sz-online.de/sachsen/regionalsport/der-bronzene-albtraum-1392237.html (In German)
https://www.cn-online.de/cn-galerie/olympia-ohne-emotionen.html (In German)

1969 births
Living people
People from Hoyerswerda
German female artistic gymnasts
Medalists at the World Artistic Gymnastics Championships
World champion gymnasts
Olympic gymnasts of East Germany
Gymnasts at the 1988 Summer Olympics
Olympic bronze medalists for East Germany
Olympic medalists in gymnastics
Medalists at the 1988 Summer Olympics
Recipients of the Patriotic Order of Merit
Sportspeople from Saxony